Markin is a village in Iran.

Markin or Markina may also refer to:

Markin (surname)
Markin Family Student Recreation Center in Illinois, United States
Markina-Xemein, a town and municipality in the Basque Autonomous Community
1980 Markina attack near Markina-Xemein
Markin (cloth), a type of salu cloth